Srabon Megher Din (English: A Day of the Month Srabon) is a Bangladeshi drama film based on the  novel of Humayun Ahmed. This movie based on a triangle tragic love story set in a classical village of Bangladesh directed by the writer himself. This film was second film directed by Humayun Ahmed released in 1999 and won National Film Award. British Film Institute enlisted this film in the Top 10 Bangladeshi Film (Critics) as a 2002 cultural project on South Asian cinema in 2002.

Plot
Moti (Zahid Hasan) is a folk singer in a village and a girl from that village Kusum (Meher Afroz Shaon) fall in love with him, even though she tries to hide it. The story take a turn when Suruj Miah (Mahfuz Ahmed) came in, who is brought by Kusum's father (Saleh Ahmed) to marry Kusum off with him. But tragedy hits in the end. Love, conflict, sorrow, tragedy all are the part in the movie.

Cast
 Abul Khair - tea stall 
 Golam Mustafa - zamindar
 Saleh Ahmed - Kusum's father
 Zahid Hasan - Moti (Gatok/Gayok)
 Meher Afroz Shaon - Kusum
 Mahfuz Ahmed - Suruj Miah
 Dr.Ejajul Islam - Poran
 Shamima Nazneen - Durga (Poran's wife)
 Anwara - Kusum's mother
 Sayeem Afran -Villan
 Mukti - Shahana
 Rawshan Jamil - Ramiz's Mother

Soundtrack

This movie was highly acclaimed for its beautiful music. The music of this film was directed by Maksud Jamil Mintu and lyrics were penned by Rashid Uddin, Wakil Munshi, and Humayun Ahmed. Subir Nandi, Sabina Yasmin, Bari Siddiqui and other popular singers sang in this film. Bari Siddiqui became popular through this film.

All music is directed by Maksud Jamil Mintu.

Awards

See also
 Aguner Poroshmoni
 Dui Duari
 Ghetuputra Komola

References

External links
 
 Srabon Megher Din at the Bangla Movie Database
 Srabon Megher Din at the Rotten Tomatoes

1999 films
1999 drama films
Bangladeshi drama films
Bengali-language Bangladeshi films
Films scored by Maksud Jamil Mintu
Films directed by Humayun Ahmed
1990s Bengali-language films
Films based on the Bangladesh Liberation War
Best Film Bachsas Award winners